Varennes-Changy is a commune in the eastern part of the Loiret department in north-central France. Varennes-Changy arises from the merger on 1 January 1971 between the former communes of Varennes-en-Gâtinais and Changy.

See also
Communes of the Loiret department

References

External links

  village website

Varenneschangy